Carlos Alfredo Urrutia Valenzuela (born 30 August 1949) was the 34th Ambassador of Colombia to the United States.

Biography
Born on 30 August 1949 in Bogotá, Colombia to Carlos Urrutia Holguín and María Teresa Valenzuela Vega.  He is the grandson of Francisco José Urrutia Olano. He was the great-grandson of Francisco de Paula Urrutia Ordóñez. He attended law school at the University of the Andes. He became a partner in 1981 and managing partner since 1999 at Brigard & Urrutia Abogados. He is an Associate Member of the American Bar Association, a Fellow at the American Bar Foundation, Member of the International Bar Association since 1999.

He was appointed Ambassador of Colombia to the United States on 5 September 2012.

References

1949 births
Living people
Carlos Alfredo
People from Bogotá
University of Los Andes (Colombia) alumni
20th-century Colombian lawyers
Ambassadors of Colombia to the United States
21st-century Colombian lawyers